Ajila is a common surname of the Bunt people, the landed gentry of Tulu Nadu region in the south west of India. It is also the name of the Jain Bunt Dynasty who ruled the principality of Venur for several centuries(1154 to 1786 C.E). The most notable of the Ajila kings was Veera Timmannarasa Ajila IV who erected the monolith of Bahubali in 1604 C.E.The descendants of the Ajila rulers still survive and inhabit the Aladangady Aramane (Ajila Palace).The succession to the Ajila throne was as per the Bunt custom of matrilineal inheritance (Aliyasantana). The present head of the Ajila dynasty is Padmaprasad Ajila, fourteenth in line through the matrilineal lineage of Veera Timmannarasa Ajila IV. An inscription in Old Kannada by Veera Timmannarasa Ajila IV unearthed in 2006 reads

See also
Jain Bunt
Venur

References

Dynasties of India
Jain dynasties
Bunt community surnames